Robert Ernest Bean (5 September 1935 – 7 December 1987) was a British Labour Party politician and polytechnic lecturer.

Having served as a councillor and fought Gillingham in 1970 and Thanet East in February 1974, Bean was elected Member of Parliament for the marginal Rochester and Chatham seat in the October of that year, ousting the Conservative incumbent Peggy Fenner.  At the 1979 general election, when the Conservatives returned to government under Margaret Thatcher, Fenner regained the seat.

Bean was beaten by Fenner again at the new Medway seat in 1983, and he died in 1987 at the age of 52. He left his beloved family of a wife, daughter and son. Nowadays he would have two granddaughters and two grandsons.

References 
Times Guide to the House of Commons 1979

External links 
 

1935 births
1987 deaths
Labour Party (UK) MPs for English constituencies
UK MPs 1974–1979
Union of Construction, Allied Trades and Technicians-sponsored MPs